Convoy OG 71 was a trade convoy of merchant ships during the second World War. It was the 71st of the numbered OG convoys Outbound from the British Isles to Gibraltar. The convoy departed Liverpool on 13 August 1941 and was found on 17 August by a Focke-Wulf Fw 200 Condor of Kampfgeschwader 40. Starting on August 19, it became the first convoy of the war to be attacked by a German submarine wolfpack, when reached by eight U-boats from 1st U-boat Flotilla, operating out of Brest. Ten ships comprising a total tonnage of 15,185 tons were sunk before the U-boats lost contact on 23 August.

Legacy 
This convoy was known as "Nightmare Convoy".  Eight merchant ships, two naval escorts and over 400 people died, including 152 from the commodore's ship,  (146 on August 19 and 6 survivors lost on August 22 when Empire Oak sank).  The Aguila losses included the 22 "lost Wrens" (members of the Women's Royal Naval Service, or WRNS) who had volunteered for duties at Gibraltar. After this, Wrens were never sent again on passenger liners in convoys, but transported on HM ships.  In their honour, a new  sloop, launched in 1942, was named , while a Liverpool-class lifeboat, launched in 1951, was named .

Of the convoy's surviving merchant ships, five reached Gibraltar while 10 retreated to neutral Portugal. This was described as the most "bitter act of surrender could ever come our way".

The two ships from neutral Ireland were carrying British coal—after this incident, the Irish ship owners decided not to sail their vessels in British convoys and by the early months of 1942 the practice had ceased.

Ships in the convoy

Allied merchant ships
A total of 23 merchant vessels joined the convoy in Liverpool.

Convoy escorts
A series of armed military ships escorted the convoy at various times during its journey.

See also
List of shipwrecks in August 1941

References

Bibliography

External links
OG.71 at convoyweb
Convoy OG 71 at uboat.net

OG071
C